Eois intacta is a moth in the  family Geometridae. It is found in Ecuador.

References

Moths described in 1904
Eois
Moths of Central America